The variegated lizardfish (Synodus variegatus) is a lizardfish of the family Synodontidae found in the western Pacific and Indian Oceans, at depths from 4 to 90 m. It can reach a maximum length of 40 cm.

Description
The variegated lizardfish is rounded in cross-section with a broad, moderately flattened head and a large, wide mouth. The jaws protrude equally. Both jaws and all the mouth bones are covered with conical, barbed teeth. The strong, thick pelvic fins serve as props when the fish is resting on the bottom waiting for prey.

The variegated lizardfish varies in color from grey to red, with hourglass-shaped markings.

Taxonomy
The species Synodus dermatogenys was once misidentified as S. variegatus, while the true S. variegatus was referred to as S. englemani Schultz, 1953 by many authors, including Gosline & Brock (1960) and Cressey (1981). However, Waples and Randall (1989) showed that S. variegatus is a senior synonym of S. englemani, and that S. dermatogenys is the correct name for the lizardfish that Cressey (1981) identified as S. variegatus.

References

External links
 Best Photo Posters & Canvas Printing - Pictures and facts about variegated lizardfish and other reef fishes
 Fishes of Australia : Synodus variegatus
 

variegated lizardfish
Marine fish of Northern Australia
variegated lizardfish

zh:縱帶狗母魚